Aegypius is a genus of Old World vultures found in the subfamily Gypinae. Of the three species in the genus, only the cinereous vulture is extant. The Cinerous vulture (Aegypius Monachus) is a creature that is hard to find as it is “a near threatened raptor that occurs in isolated populations across its range” (Çakmak). There were studies being conducted on the cinerous vulture and it indicates “that the Turkish birds hold, along with those from the Caucasus, an intermediate position between European (Balkan and Iberian) and North Asian (Mongolian) lineages” (Çakmak). The genus name Aegypius is a Greek word (αἰγυπιός) for 'vulture', or a bird not unlike one; Aelian describes the aegypius as "halfway between a vulture (gyps) and an eagle". Some authorities think this a good description of a lammergeier; others do not. Aegypius is the eponym of the species, whatever it was.

The only exustant species from this genus is the Cinereous Vulture or the Aegypius monachus. This vulture is one of the largest birds of prey and it plays a huge role in its various ecosystems by eating carcasses, and which in turn reduces the spread of diseases (Chung et al., 2015). The vultures are constantly exposed to many pathogens because of their eating habits (Chung et al., 2015). A study on the gastric and immune defense systems done in 2015, sequenced the entire genome of the cinereous genome (Chung et al., 2015). Comparing the vulture and the bald eagle, will allow the study to find positively selected genetic variations associated with respiration and the ability of the vulture's immune defense responses and gastric acid secretion to digest carcasses (Chung et al., 2015).

References 

 
Bird genera
Bird genera with one living species
Taxa named by Marie Jules César Savigny